Mavis Akoto (born 22 March 1978) is a Ghanaian sprinter. She competed in the women's 4 × 100 metres relay at the 2000 Summer Olympics.

References

External links
 

1978 births
Living people
Athletes (track and field) at the 2000 Summer Olympics
Ghanaian female sprinters
Olympic athletes of Ghana
Place of birth missing (living people)
African Games medalists in athletics (track and field)
African Games bronze medalists for Ghana
Athletes (track and field) at the 1999 All-Africa Games
Olympic female sprinters